PDX Pop Now! is a local annual music festival held in Portland, Oregon, and a 100% volunteer-run registered 501(c)(3) non-profit organization that organizes and promotes the festival event. It consists of a two-disc compilation released in spring; a multi-day, free, all-ages music festival in the summer; and school and community outreach programs throughout the year. The organization and the event are dedicated to "celebrating, promoting, and enhancing Portland’s vital and diverse music community." The festival was first held in 2004, and has occurred every year since that time.

History
PDX Pop Now! originated from a discussion on PDX Pop, Portland Indiepop Mailing list, a long running listserv for Portland musicians, fans, and writers interested in discussing the local music scene. On Jan 15th, 2004 Kell Dockham started a question about the sense of true unity in Portland music scene which ignited and inspired PDX Pop list members to organize a festival to celebrate local music. After two initial meetings, on Feb 3rd, 2004, Joshua Kirby sent out a meeting note to the PDX Pop list and pronounced the working title "PDX Pop Now", and thus a festival was born. This is how one e-email became a music festival.

From then on members of the PDX Pop list formed their own PDX POP Now! board and committee, and worked toward organizing the first PDX Pop Now! music festival, which was held July 9–July 11 at Meow Meow, a music venue on Portland's industrial east side. In support of the large number of underage fans, the organizers made the conscious decision to open the festival up to all ages. To prevent other barriers to attendance, they made a similar dedication to keep festival admission free of charge and to hold it at venues close to public transportation routes. To fund the festival, organizers curated a two-disc local music compilation. Subsequent festivals were held in 2005 and 2006 at Loveland, and in 2007 at AudioCinema. 2005, 2006, and 2007 also brought additional music compilations, for which the organization has received considerable attention from the media. Since 2014 the festival has been held under the Hawthorne Bridge in Southeast Portland. 

The festival was cancelled for live events, though it went virtual in 2020.

Musician support
A number of notable Portland musical acts have appeared on the PDX Pop Now! compilation or at the festival, including 50 Foot Wave, Alan Singley and Pants Machine, Blitzen Trapper, The Blow, The Decemberists, The Helio Sequence, Hockey (band), Lifesavas, M.Ward, Menomena, Mirah, Quasi, Sleater-Kinney, The Shins, The Shaky Hands, and The Thermals.

References

External links
Official site for PDX Pop Now!
Portland IndiePop Mailing List
Podcast with PDX Pop Now! board member Brent Bell

Music festivals in Oregon
Festivals in Portland, Oregon
2004 establishments in Oregon
Annual events in Portland, Oregon
Music festivals established in 2004